Timbaland and Magoo: Present is a compilation album released by American hip-hop duo Timbaland & Magoo on March 14, 2005. The collection includes a seventeen-track album, containing a selection of the duo's singles and favourite tracks, as well material from Timbaland's solo album Tim's Bio: Life from da Bassment, packaged with a bonus DVD featuring eleven music videos, including six of the duo's own video clips, plus additional videos by Aaliyah and Justin Timberlake. Six months before the album was released, a promotional taster extended play was released on 12" vinyl. It includes four tracks.

Track listing

References

Magoo (rapper) albums
Timbaland albums
Albums produced by Timbaland
2005 compilation albums
2005 video albums
Music video compilation albums
Interscope Records compilation albums
Interscope Records video albums